Slinfold Stream and Quarry is a  geological Site of Special Scientific Interest west of Horsham in West Sussex. It is a Geological Conservation Review site.

This site exposes the Horsham Stone member of the Lower Weald Clay, dating to the Early Cretaceous, around 130 million years ago.

A public footpath goes through a small stretch of the stream bank but the rest of the site is private land with no public access.

References

Sites of Special Scientific Interest in West Sussex
Geological Conservation Review sites